The Bureau is a French political thriller television series created by Éric Rochant and produced by TOP – The Oligarchs Productions and Canal+, which revolves around the lives of agents of the DGSE (General Directorate of External Security), France's principal external security service. Originally aired in France from 27 April 2015, it was launched in the United States and Canada on iTunes on 1 June 2016 as part of a new international "Episodic Cinema" label, quickly reaching the Top Five. In the United Kingdom, the series was released exclusively by Amazon Prime on 17 June 2016.

The first season received positive reviews in both France and other countries, and won several awards. The second season has been universally acclaimed, and has even been seen by some as the best television ever produced in France. The third and fourth seasons, respectively aired in France beginning 22 May 2017 and 22 October 2018, have met with further acclaim, with praise for the show's acting, pacing, plot and realism. There is also a fifth season.

Synopsis 

The Bureau is based upon real accounts by former spies and inspired by contemporary events, and centres on the daily life and missions of agents within France's Directorate-General for External Security, its principal external security service. It focuses on the "Bureau of Legends", responsible for training and handling deep-cover agents (operating 'under legend') on long-term missions in areas with French interests, especially in North Africa and the Middle East. Living under false identities for years, these agents' missions are to identify and recruit good intelligence sources.

The series features intelligence officer Guillaume Debailly, codenamed "Malotru" (literally "Lout") who returns to Paris after six years undercover in Damascus. He has to face the challenge of reconnecting with his daughter, ex-wife, colleagues, and even his old self. But his return to 'normal life' proves difficult, especially when he discovers that Nadia, who was his love in Damascus, is now also in Paris. The first season follows his attempts to navigate the rules of life as a spy, and his increasingly tenuous position with Nadia.

The second season continues with the same themes, four months later, but also focuses on another character from the first season, Marina Loiseau. She is leaving for Tehran to work undercover as a specialist in seismology, in order to gather intelligence about Iran's nuclear weapons programme. Guillaume has been promoted to deputy director but also becomes a double agent on behalf of the CIA. He becomes increasingly desperate to resolve the situation with Nadia, which culminates in serious consequences for them both. Meanwhile, the DGSE has the challenge of a bloodthirsty French jihadist who is publicly taunting France.

Cast and characters 

Some character codenames are based on Captain Haddock's expletives.
 Mathieu Kassovitz as Guillaume Debailly, codename "Malotru" (Lout). After six years undercover in Damascus, Syria, he returns to Paris but finds it difficult to re-adapt to a more normal life. When he learns that Nadia El Mansour, his lover in Damascus, is in Paris, he breaks the rules and renews their affair, returning to his false identity as Paul Lefebvre. (season 1– ) 
 Sara Giraudeau as Marina Loiseau, codename "Phénomène" (Phenomenon) later "Rocambole", a young and brilliant woman who has been cast to become the next deep-cover agent pretending to be a seismologist. She is under intense training to prepare an infiltration of the Iranian nuclear industry and later the Russian cybercenter. (season 1– )
 Jean-Pierre Darroussin as Henri Duflot, codename "Socrate", Director of the Service of Clandestines, a unit within the DGSE also known as the Bureau of Legends. (season 1–3, guest season 4-5) 
 Léa Drucker as Dr Laurène Balmes, a new recruit as a psychiatrist specialised in behavioural psychology. She assists the agents in manipulating their targets, but is also working as a double agent for the CIA. (season 1–3) 
 Zineb Triki as Nadia El Mansour, a Syrian professor of history and Debailly's lover from Damascus. Their relationship and her role in seeking to resolve the Syrian conflict form the crux of the first season. (season 1–3, 5, guest season 4) 
 Gilles Cohen as Colonel Marc Lauré, codename "MAG" (acronym standing for "Moule à gaufres" or Waffle iron), Director of Intelligence and Henri Duflot's boss. (season 1–4) 
 Florence Loiret-Caille as Marie-Jeanne Duthilleul, Debailly's handler, who becomes Loiseau's handler after Debailly's return from Syria. During season 3, she succeeds Henri Duflot as head of the Bureau. (season 1– ) 
 Jonathan Zaccaï as Raymond Sisteron, a colleague of Debailly. (season 1– ) 
 Pauline Étienne as Céline Delorme, a regional expert on the Middle East and North Africa.
 Jules Sagot as Sylvain Ellenstein, a DGSE agent specialised in electronic surveillance. (season 1– ) 
 Mathieu Demy as Clément Migaud, head of the Iran service.
 Alexandre Brasseur and Michaël Abiteboul as Pépé and Mémé (grandpa and grandma), two DGSE agents in charge of operational support (tailing, escort, logistics, intimidation). (season 1–2, 5) 
 Patrick Ligardes as Marcel Gaingouin, Director of Operations of the DGSE.
 Mathieu Amalric as Jean-Jacques Angel (JJA), director of the DGSE security service (DSEC) (supposedly based on James Jesus Angleton). (season 4–5 )
 Stefan Godin as Pierre de Lattre de Tassigny, Director General of the DGSE.
 Alba Gaïa Bellugi as Prune Debailly, the daughter of Guillaume Debailly.
 Elodie Navarre as Emilie Duflot, the wife of Henri Duflot. (season 1–3) 
 Artus as Jonas Maury, the Syrian analyst
 Rajae as Rajae Rina , the Palestinian analyst
 Alice Belaïdi as Sabrina Boumaza (season 2) 
 Jean-Marie Rollin as Edouard Rubin
 Irina Muluile as Daisy Bappé ("The Mule"), Operational support in France (field surveillance, escort, logistics). (season 1– )
 Oleksiy Gorbunov as Mikhail Dmitrievich Karlov, Deputy Director of the FSB. (season 4–5)
 Anne Azoulay as Liz Bernstein.

Broadcast 

The Bureau originally came to French television in 2015 on the premium network Canal+ with a ten-episode first season. This was the best performing new drama on the French premium pay net since Les Revenants in 2012. It was quickly renewed for a second season, broadcast in 2016, and further renewed for a third season in May 2016.

In the United States and Canada, the series was first launched exclusively on iTunes where it remained in the Top Five most downloaded TV seasons for two weeks, with several episodes in the top 100 most downloaded and a 4.5/5 viewer rating. In the United Kingdom, the series was released exclusively on Amazon Prime on 17 June 2016. In the United States, seasons 1-5 are now available to Amazon Prime customers, but require the purchase of either AMC Networks' Sundance Now or AMC+ premium channel additions. In Germany, it was sold to RTL Crime for broadcast in 2016. In Australia, it aired on public broadcaster SBS, and all five seasons are currently available on their free streaming service SBS On Demand until 30 November 2023.

Reception

Critical reception 
The programme was well received by audiences and critics. In its domestic market, the first season received very positive reviews. Le Monde commented on its "mastery of its subject" and "rigorous construction of narrative arcs" and lauded its "different and credible tone". Le Nouvel Observateur compared it to Mad Men and congratulated it on "staging that exceptional routine with flair and breathing life into a convincing team of heroes".

The second season was immensely popular. Télérama called it "captivating, subtly written, staged and acted: a mission accomplished" and Le Figaro stated that "to this day, this series is the best ever made in France".

The New York Times described the series as "moody, cynical & stylish ... consistently smart and understated". Broadwayworld also wrote a positive review, describing it as "a riveting spy story told with psychological sophistication and cinematic flair".

Awards

Season 1 
 Séries Mania Festival 2015:
 International Press Jury Award - Best Male Actor (Mathieu Kassovitz)
 French Syndicate of Cinema Critics Award: Best Series 
 French TV Critics Association Awards (A.C.S.): Best Male Actor (Mathieu Kassovitz) (2015)

Season 2 
 COLCOA French Film Festival:
 TV Series Jury Special Prize
 TV Series Audience Award
 French TV Critics Association Awards (A.C.S.): Best Production (2016)
 French TV Critics Association Awards (A.C.S.): Best Female Actor (Sara Giraudeau) (2016)
 Le Parisien: Best French Series (2016)
 Télérama: Top 10 Series 2016 (N°1)
 Globes de Cristal Award: Best French Series (2016)

Season 3 
French TV Critics Association Awards (A.C.S.): Best Series (2017)
French TV Critics Association Awards (A.C.S.): Best Writing (2017)

Season 4 

 Télérama: Top 10 Series 2018 (N°1)

Season 5 

TV France International: Export Fiction Award 2020
Grand prix des Média: Best Fictional TV show 2020

References

External links 
 
 

French political drama television series
Espionage television series
2015 French television series debuts
Canal+ original programming
Directorate-General for External Security
2010s French drama television series